Paul Aimé Fleury (born July 20, 1939) is an American physicist and academic administrator.  He was the Dean of the Faculty of Engineering at Yale University and is the Frederick W. Beinecke Professor of Engineering and Applied Physics and Professor of Physics.
 
Fleury was born in Baltimore, Maryland and educated at John Carroll University (B.S, 1960) and MIT (Ph.D., 1965).  Fleury was at AT&T Bell Laboratories from 1970 until 1995 including work at Sandia National Laboratories. Fleury was the Dean of the School of Engineering at the University of New Mexico from 1996-2000.  He then succeeded D. Allan Bromley as Dean of Engineering at Yale.  In 2007, he became the director of the Yale Institute for Nanoscience and Quantum Engineering. He kept that position after retiring from the deanship at the end of 2007.

His research has been in experimental condensed matter physics and material science including dynamic aspects of phase transformations and optical spectroscopy.

Fleury was elected a member of the National Academy of Engineering in 1996 for discoveries related to ferroelectric, acoustic, and nonlinear performance of materials, and for management leadership in materials. He is also a member of the National Academy of Sciences and the American Academy of Arts and Sciences and a Fellow of the American Association for the Advancement of Science.  He received the Michelson–Morley Award (1985) and the Frank Isakson prize for optical effects in solids (1992) from the American Physical Society.

References
 "Paul Aimé Fleury." Marquis Who's Who, 2006. Reproduced in Biography Resource Center. Farmington Hills, Mich.: Thomson Gale. 2007.

External links 
 Biography at Yale

Living people
Members of the United States National Academy of Sciences
1939 births
21st-century American physicists
Yale University faculty
Yale School of Engineering & Applied Science faculty
Massachusetts Institute of Technology alumni
Members of the United States National Academy of Engineering
John Carroll University alumni
Fellows of the American Academy of Arts and Sciences
Fellows of the American Association for the Advancement of Science
Sandia National Laboratories people
University of New Mexico faculty